Paul Smith's Hotel, formally known as the Saint Regis House, was founded in 1859 by Apollos (Paul) Smith in the town of Brighton, Franklin County, New York, in what would become the village of Paul Smiths; it was one of the first wilderness resorts in Adirondacks. In its day it was the most fashionable of the many great Adirondack hotels, patronized by American presidents Grover Cleveland, Theodore Roosevelt and Calvin Coolidge, celebrities like P.T. Barnum, and the power elite of the latter half of the 19th century, such as E. H. Harriman and Whitelaw Reid. Smith died in 1912, but the hotel continued under his son, Phelps, until it burned down in 1930.

For years the hotel was kept intentionally primitive, offering neither bellboys nor indoor bathrooms. It started as a seventeen-room inn, though by the start of the 20th century it would grow to 255 rooms with a boathouse with quarters for sixty guides, stables, casino, bowling alley, and a wire to the New York Stock Exchange. It also had woodworking, blacksmith, and electrical shops, a sawmill and a store. Stagecoaches delivered guests to the hotel until 1906, when a short electric railroad connected it to the nearest main line.

See also
Upper St. Regis Lake
Spitfire Lake
Seven Carries
Adirondack Architecture

Sources
Donaldson, Alfred L., A History of the Adirondacks. New York: Century, 1921. . (reprint)
Jerome, Christine Adirondack Passage: Cruise of Canoe Sairy Gamp, HarperCollins, 1994. .

External links
History of the Town of Brighton
Historic Saranac Lake
New York Times, August 30, 1903, "Season in the Adirondacks Shows No Signs of Waning; Outdoor Sports of All Kinds Followed by Fancy Dress Balls and Bowling and Pool Tournaments -- Fair at Paul Smith's Hotel a Big Success."

Adirondacks
Buildings and structures in Franklin County, New York
Hotels in New York (state)
Smith, Paul Hotel
Burned hotels in the United States
Paul Smiths, New York